Hay Lake 209 is an Indian reserve of the Dene Tha' First Nation in Alberta, located within Mackenzie County. In the 2016 Canadian Census, it recorded a population of 883 living in 247 of its 277 total private dwellings.

References

Mackenzie County
Indian reserves in Alberta